The Modern News Building is a historic commercial building at 216 North Main Street in downtown Harrisburg, Arkansas.  It is a single-story rectangular brick building, with a flat roof and simple styling.  A tall front steps down toward the rear of the building, with the side walls capped in ceramic tile. The original building measured only 40 feet deep, in 1915 an addition of 15 feet was added, then as additional 20 feet was added in 1952. The facade is three bays wide, with a center entry flanked by recessed windows.  The brick facade was changed from the original design in 1953 as an attempt to modernize the building. Included in the gallery of this article, are a couple photos showing the original facade. A canvas awning extends across the facade.  The building was built in 1896, and is significant as the home of The Modern News, which has been Harrisburg's newspaper until 2018. An account in an 1896 Modern News paper, revealed the correct date of construction to be 1896, rather than the more commonly believed date of 1888. Prior to 1896, it is believed the newspaper was run from the courthouse. L.D. Freeman purchased the newspaper in Harrisburg and changed its name in 1888. Before Freeman bought the business, the newspaper was called The Arkansas Tribune,  and it is unclear of what date that started, though it would have been around 1873. It is local folklore that the original printing press that was being replaced was too large and heavy to remove from the structure, so someone went under the building, dug a hole deep enough for the press to fit, cut the floor out from underneath it, and buried it, sealing it with a new concrete floor throughout. It is a great pride the people of Harrisburg, Arkansas have that we possess most all of the original prints of the Modern News Paper in their original binding. Poinsett County Historical Society has worked with the Poinsett County Library to document these fragile historical documents by use of a scanner to help digitize them so they are more accessible to the public. The scans can be seen and studied at the local library just around the corner from the newspaper building. In addition to the collection of Modern News papers, several dozen original copies of The Arkansas Tribune from the 1870s are also still in existence. The building was sold in 2019 from an heir of the original founders. This building remains a local landmark, despite the newspaper closing its doors.

The building was listed on the National Register of Historic Places in 1976.

See also
National Register of Historic Places listings in Poinsett County, Arkansas

References

External links

The Modern News web site

Commercial buildings on the National Register of Historic Places in Arkansas
Commercial buildings completed in 1888
Buildings and structures in Poinsett County, Arkansas
National Register of Historic Places in Poinsett County, Arkansas
Historic district contributing properties in Arkansas